The Guartelá Canyon (Portuguese: Cânion Guartelá) is a canyon in Tibagi and Castro, Paraná, Brazil.
The canyon of the Iapó River is protected by the  Guartelá State Park, created in 1992.

References 

Canyons of Paraná
Landforms of Paraná (state)
Tibagi
Castro, Paraná